Gurun Princess Wenzhuang (固倫溫莊公主; 9 August 1625 – 1663), personal name Makata (馬喀塔), was a princess of the Qing dynasty. She was a daughter of Hong Taiji born by his Mongol wife, Empress Xiaoduanwen.

Life 
Lady Makata born on 9 August 1625, her biological mother was the future Empress Xiaoduanwen, who at that time was only a primary consort of Hong Taiji.

On the 10th day of the first lunar month in the tenth year of Tiancong (1636), Makata married Ejei Khan, last khagan of Northern Yuan dynasty. He was granted the title of First Rank Prince. She remained childless during her first marriage. In the 5th of Chongde, Huang Taiji and his wives went hunting together with Princess Makata and her husband.

After her first husband death, she marriedAbunai, a younger brother of Ejei Khan,  in 1645. She gave birth to two sons during her second marriage, Borni (布尔尼) and Lubuzung (罗布藏).

In 1657, during the reign of Shunzhi, she was granted the title of Princess of the First Rank (固倫長公主) .Two year later, she was named Imperial Princess Yongning of the First Rank (固倫永寧長公主).

During the end of Shunzhi reign, her title was renamed.She became Princess Wenzhuang of the First Rank (固倫溫莊公主).

Family 
Parents:

 Father: Hong Taiji, Emperor Wen of the Aisin Gioro clan (皇太極 文皇帝 愛新覺羅氏)
 Mother: Empress Xiaoduanwen of the Khorchin Borjigit clan (孝端文皇后 博爾濟吉特氏)

Consort:

 Ejei Khan, of the Chahar Borjigin clan (額哲 察哈尔部氏; d. 1641)
 Abunai, of the Chahar Borjigin clan (阿布奈 察哈尔部氏; d. 1675)
 Borni (布尔尼; 1654 – 1675 ), Prince Chahar of the First Rank (察哈尔亲王), first son
 Lubuzung (罗布藏; d.1675), second son

Ancestry

See also 

 Ranks of imperial consorts in China#Qing
 Royal and noble ranks of the Qing dynasty

References 

1625 births
1663 deaths
Qing dynasty princesses
Manchu people